is one of the eight wards of Niigata City, Niigata Prefecture, in the Hokuriku region of Japan. , the ward had an estimated population of 55,963 in 20,369 households  and a population density of 320 persons per km².

Geography
Nishikan-ku is located in southwestern Niigata City, bordered by the Sea of Japan to the west. Mount Yahiko is on the border of Nishikan-ku with the neighbouring city of Nagaoka.

Surrounding municipalities
Niigata Prefecture
 Nishi-ku, Niigata
 Minami-ku, Niigata
 Yahiko
 Tsubame
 Nagaoka

Climate

History
The area of present-day Nishikan-ku was part of ancient Echigo Province. The town of Sone and the village of Iwamuro were established on April 1, 1889 within Nakakanbara District, Niigata with the establishment of the municipalities system. The town of Maki was created on April 10, 1891 by the merger of 14 hamlets, and expanded on January 1, 1955 by annexing five neighbouring villages. The town of Nishikawa  was founded on January 1, 1955 by the merger of Sone with the village of Masugata. The city of Niigata annexed the towns of Maki and Masugata and the villages of Iwamuro, Katahigashi  and Nakanokuchi on March 21, 2005. Niigata became a government-designated city on April 1, 2007 and was divided into wards, with the new Nishikan Ward consisting of these areas.

Education
Nishikan-ku has 13 public elementary schools and six public middle schools operated by the Niigata city government. The ward has three public high schools operated by the Niigata Prefectural Board of Education. The prefecture also operates two special education schools.

Transportation

Railway
 JR East - Echigo Line
   -  -

Highways
 Hokuriku Expressway 
 
  (Seaside Line)

Local attractions

 Iwamuro Onsen (hot spring) Resort
 Taho Onsen (hot spring)
 Mount Kakuda
 Uwasekigata Lagoon Park
 Maze Sea Circuit

References

Notes

External links

 Niigata official website 
 Niigata Nishikan-ku website 
 Niigata City Official Tourist Information (multilingual)
 Niigata Pref. Official Travel Guide (multilingual)

Wards of Niigata (city)